The Schilt (2,299 m) is a mountain of the Glarus Alps, overlooking Glarus in the canton of Glarus. It lies south of the Siwellen.

References

External links
 Schilt on Hikr

Mountains of the Alps
Mountains of Switzerland
Mountains of the canton of Glarus
Two-thousanders of Switzerland